Sırakonak can refer to:

 Sırakonak, İspir
 Sırakonak, Kemaliye